Roseland may refer to:

 Roseland (film), a 1977 Merchant Ivory film
 Roseland (band), a musical collaboration (duo) between Tyler Bates and Azam Ali
 Roseland NYC Live, a live album and DVD by Portishead

Buildings and organisations
Roseland (Ferriday, Louisiana), listed on the NRHP in Louisiana
Roseland (Kingsport, Tennessee), listed on the NRHP in Tennessee
 Roseland Ballroom in New York City
 Roseland Christian School in Chicago, Illinois, United States
 Roseland Cottage in Woodstock, Connecticut, United States
 Roseland Observatory, an astronomical observatory in Cornwall, England
 Roseland Park, a defunct amusement park in New York State
Roseland Plantation (Faunsdale, Alabama), listed on the NRHP in Alabama
 Roseland Theater, a concert venue in Portland, Oregon, United States
 Roseland Waterpark in Canandaigua, New York

Places

Canada
Roseland, Windsor, Ontario, Canada
Roseland, Manitoba, Canada

United Kingdom
 Roseland Peninsula, Cornwall, United Kingdom

United States
 Roseland, California
 Roseland, Florida
 Roseland, Chicago, Illinois
 Roseland, Indiana
 Roseland, Kansas
 Roseland, Louisiana
 Roseland, Minnesota
 Roseland, Missouri
 Roseland, Nebraska
 Roseland, New Jersey
 Roseland, Ohio
 Roseland Township, Kandiyohi County, Minnesota
 Roseland Township, Adams County, Nebraska

See also
Rose Land Park Plat Historic District, East Providence Rhode Island, United States
Roselands, New South Wales, Australia